2-deoxystreptamine N-acetyl-D-glucosaminyltransferase (btrM (gene), neoD (gene), kanF (gene)) is an enzyme with systematic name UDP-N-acetyl-alpha-D-glucosamine:2-deoxystreptamine N-acetyl-D-glucosaminyltransferase. This enzyme catalyses the following chemical reaction

 UDP-N-acetyl-alpha-D-glucosamine + 2-deoxystreptamine  UDP + 2'-N-acetylparomamine

Involved in the biosynthetic pathways of several clinically important aminocyclitol antibiotics.

References

External links 

EC 2.4.1